Géraldine Le Meur (born May 1972) is a French innovator and business executive. She studied at Skema Business School, graduated in 1995. In 2004, together with her former husband Loïc Le Meur, she founded LeWeb (initially called LesBlog) which developed into a popular series of Paris-based conferences for digital innovators and entrepreneurs. She is currently CEO of the French company Business Space which in April 2015 reacquired LeWeb.

Now based in New-York after having lived 13 years in San Francisco, Le Meur has held senior positions in several companies she and her husband founded. In 1997, she co-founded and was CEO for RapidSite France (later sold to France Telecom) and she went on to manage the early blogging initiative Ublog which was merged with Six Apart in 2004 while she was its marketing director for Europe, the Middle East and Africa (2003–07). More recently, she was the CEO of LeWeb before it was bought by Reed Exhibitions in 2012. In April 2015, Géraldine and Loïc Le Meur reacquired LeWeb through their Paris-based firm Business Space as Reed Exhibitions believed the market for exhibitions in the sector was becoming saturated.

She is now  the head of the LeFonds by French Founders.
She is also the Co-founder of The Refiners.

She published in Oct 2018, "Comme Elles entreprenez votre vie!", translated in english "Step it up" about women entrepreneurship and real life role models.

Knight of the French Legion of Honor ,mother of three boys, Géraldine Le Meur lives now in New York.

References

1972 births
Living people
French business executives
21st-century French businesswomen
21st-century French businesspeople
Women innovators